The Institute of Management Development and Research (IMDR) in Pune, India, is the oldest management institution in Pune, and comes under the Deccan Education Society. Earlier IMDR was offering three full-time programmes: Post Graduate Diploma in Management (PGDM), Post Graduate Diploma in International Trade (PGDIT) and Post Graduate Diploma in Human Resources (PGDHR), along with its other part-time programmes. In 2011 IMDR got AICTE approval, and currently IMDR is offering PGDM course approved by AICTE and DTE.

History
The Institute of Management Development and Research (IMDR) was founded by Dr R. T. Doshi and Shri Sumatilal Shah in 1974, as a constituent unit of the Deccan Education Society. They were closely associated with Wrangler G. S. Mahajani, who had served as the Principal of Fergusson College in Pune and later, as the Vice Chancellor of Pune University.

In 1973, Wrangler Mahajani in his capacity as the Vice Chancellor, suggested to the D. E. Society that a new institution be formed to impart management education under its aegis. Dr Doshi and Shri Shah not only made large donations but also mobilized funds from their friends and associates. It is with these funds that the main building of IMDR was constructed on the historic Fergusson campus.

Wr. Mahajani made the suggestion to set up an institute outside the university, from a point of view that the professional and inter-disciplinary nature of management education required a different ambience. From 1974 to 1977, IMDR conducted the courses under affiliation to the university. It took over the MBA programme of the MBA Centre of the University of Pune and the DBM programme, run in the Brihan Maharashtra College of Commerce (BMCC, a sister institution) since 1968. Affiliated to the University of Pune, the IMDR was also a recognised centre for research leading to a PhD

In 1977, the IMDR became an autonomous institution by voluntarily delinking from the University of Pune. Since then it has carried on its activities independent of the university or other statutory bodies.

Campus
The Instructional area available on the IMDR campus includes classrooms, tutorial room, library, computer centre and an auditorium with the seating capacity of 175. The main campus has an administrative block, students' common room, canteen and other amenities, including the reprographic facility which is made available for students on the campus. The total built up area is over 24,000 sq feet. There are ten residential units for the non-teaching staff and three for the teaching staff.

Associated institutes

The college shares its campus with Fergusson College and Jaganath Rathi Vocational Guidance and Training Institute (JRGVTI), both governed by the Deccan Education Society. Brihan Maharashtra College of Commerce (BMCC), established in 1943, is closely associated with Fergusson College. At the northern end of the campus, next to the New Academic Building, lies DES Law College.

The Deccan Gymkhana area of western Pune is well known for its educational institutes. Gokhale Institute of Politics and Economics, Marathwada College of Commerce and Symbiosis International University are other well-known colleges situated around the Hanuman Tekdi hillock that overlooks Fergusson. Also located nearby are the ILS Law College, Bhandarkar Oriental Research Institute and the Agarkar Research Institute.

Affiliation
The All India Council for Technical Education (AICTE) and the Directorate of Technical Education (DTE) have approved IMDR's PGDM programme with an intake of 180 students. The institute is a member of the Association of Management Development Institutions in South Asia (AMDISA), the Confederation of Indian Industry International Chamber of Commerce (CII), the Indo-German Chamber of Commerce, the Indo-French Chamber of Commerce, and the Mahratta Chamber of Commerce, Industries and Agriculture (MCCIA).

Eligibility
All candidates to the PGDM of IMDR are required to take the CAT (Common Admission Test) of the Indian Institutes of Management (IIM). Recently IMDR got AICTE approval and because of AICTE & DTE approval, other entrance tests like MAT/ CMAT/ XAT/ ATMA/ GMAT are accepted. The institute also accepts scores from MH-CET. You can check the admission section on official institute website for latest updates.

Library
The library has a total collection of 17,058 books and reference sources, 763 CDs, 231 DVDs, 1,250 seminar reports/ working papers, and 364 audio-visual cassettes. There are currently 77 journals and bound volumes of some prominent journal materiel that have been kept for over 12 years. It has eight English and four local language newspapers, which are preserved for six months and three months respectively.

Course offered (PGDM)
The Post Graduate Diploma in Management (PGDM) is a two-year full-time programme. The programme is divided into four semesters, each of approximately 16 weeks. Classes are usually held from 9 am to 5 pm. The USP of the course is the embedded six months internship program, conducted during the second semester.

Specializations Offered
The Institute of Management Development and Research offers dual specialization for the PGDM course. The specializations offered are Marketing, Finance, Human Resource Management and Supply chain & Operations as Major Specialization. Also the following specializations are offered as Minor: Business Analytics, Entrepreneurship & Start-up Management, International Trade and Business Technology & Systems.

References

 IMDR website
 Top 25 B-schools in 2007
 Pagalguy Ranking 2012
 2IIM.COM
 Top B-school rankings by average salary (in 2008)

Education in Pune
Business schools in Maharashtra
Universities and colleges in Pune
Deccan Education Society